Prunus rivularis, known variously by the common names creek plum, hog plum, or wild-goose plum is a thicket-forming shrub. It prefers calcareous clay soil or limestone-based woodland soils. This deciduous plant belongs to the rose family, Rosaceae, and is found mainly in the central United States. It is a shrub consisting of slender stems with umbel clusters of white blossoms. The fruit is a drupe that resembles a large berry; though it has a bitter taste, it serves as a source of food for birds and other wildlife. "Prunus" is Latin for plum, whereas "rivularis" means being near a stream.

Description
The leaves are simple and alternately arranged along the stems. The base shape of the leaf is considered cuneate while the apex is acuminate. The margin or edges is described as serrate; usually with 10–11 teeth per centimeter.

Flowers of this plant usually blossom around March to April. The inflorescence type is considered a raceme, where there are flower spikes from stalks that pawn out from the stem. They occur in clusters of 2 to 8 on leaf axils. The pedicels on which the flowers are attached measure to 15–16 mm. They have a green and glabrous surface. The glabrous hypanthium is considered the floral tube. P. rivularis is defined as a perigynous plant. The hypanthium's length and width is measured out to be 2 to 2.5 mm, respectively. The calyx lobes, or sepals of a flower, are found in a cluster of 5. The sepal has an oblong leaf shape and is measured 2 millimeters. The apex has a flat tip or truncate shape. There is a sugar-producing gland at the tip in which the leaves cup around. The margins are ciliate and the sides are pubescent. There are 5 white petals that are measured with a length of 5 mm. The petal margins are cupped and have an undulated (wavy) shape. There are on average of 20 stamen; the filaments are long and slender, 4–6 mm long while the anthers have a yellowish tint. The stamen is planted on the base of the hypanthium where the ovary is placed in the superior position. The ovary has a dark green hue and is measured 1–1.5 mm long while the style is white and is measured 5–6 mm long.

The fruit ripens in late July. It is a drupe with a stony endocarp, fleshy mesocarp and soft exocarp. They can appear alone or in a cluster of 2 or 3 other fruits. The pedicel that stems from the fruit is slender and glabrous, measured to be 13–16 mm long. The fruit shape is globular and has an orangeish-reddish tint. It is 17–22 mm long as it is wide. It has a very juicy mesocarp, though it is quite bitter in taste. The endocarp is 9–11 mm wide and 13–15 mm thick.

Distribution and habitat
Prunus rivularis is native to the United States; found in California, Arkansas, southern Illinois, south-eastern Kansas, Kentucky, northern Louisiana, Mississippi, Missouri, southwestern Ohio, Oklahoma, Tennessee, and Texas. It can be found in a variety of places in nature: places like creeksides, wooden canyons, bottom of valleys and flooded plains. This plant grows on limestone-based woodland or sandy soil. The moisture of the soil can vary between dry and moist, though the soil has to be well drained. (In other words, water is readily removed from the soil). The preferred pH is slightly more alkaline (greater than 7.2). It is hardy to levels of 6–9 because of its varied distribution. This implies that the USDA zones, or geographically designated zones of temperature of which plants can grow under, are found in the southern U.S. The temperature ranges between -10° and 30° Fahrenheit.

Ecology 
P. rivularis is considered perennial, in which it can survive for more than two or more years. The fruits produced are usually consumed by birds and other mammals. The flowers are known to attract insects such as butterflies and bees.

Medicinal
All members of the genus Prunus contain amygdalin and prunasin. These compounds are found in leaves and seeds. These substances can form hydrogen cyanide through subsequent reactions in water.

Uses
The leaves can be used to produce dyes ranging from green to dark gray.

The fruit was eaten by American Indians in Texas.

Notes

References

External links
 
 
 Lady Bird Johnson Wildflower Center, University of Texas, photo of fruit of Prunus rivularis in Texas
 photo of herbarium specimen at Missouri Botanical Garden, collected in Texas in 1846

rivularis
rivularis
Plants described in 1848
Flora of the United States